Pain Ab-e Sofla Sharqi (also Romanized as Pā'īn Āb-e Soflá Sharqī; also known as Pā'īnāb-e Pā'īn and Pā'īn Āb-e Soflá) is a village in Kakavand-e Sharqi Rural District, Kakavand District, Delfan County, Lorestan Province, Iran. At the 2006 census, its population was 81, in 19 families.

References 

Towns and villages in Delfan County